Anaiyur may refer to:

 Anaiyur, Madurai, a town in Madurai district in the state of Tamil Nadu, India
 Anaiyur, Virudhunagar, a town in Virudhunagar district in the state of Tamil Nadu, India 
Anaiyur, Ramanathapuram, a small village situated in Abiramam block, Kamuthi taluk, Ramanathapuram district, Tamil Nadu, India